These are lists of the most common Spanish surnames in Spain, Mexico, The Caribbean (Puerto Rico, Cuba, Dominican Republic), and Guatemala.

Spain

List of the most common Surnames in Spain. 

 García – 1,378,000 people (3.48%) Pre-Roman, Basque.
 Fernández – 851,000 (2.15%) Son of Fernando; Germanic
 González – 839,000 (2.12%) Son of Gonzalo, from the Latinised form Gundisalvus; Germanic Vidal 
 Rodríguez – 804,000 (2.03%) Son of Rodrigo, Roderic; Germanic
 López – 796,000 (2.01%) Son of Lope, Latin Lupus, meaning wolf
 Martínez – 788,000 (1.97%) Son of Martín, Son of Martino, Latin Martis, genitive form of Mars
 Sánchez – 725,000 (1.83%) Son of Sancho, Latin Sanctius
 Pérez – 709,000 (1.79%) Son of Pedro, Latin Petrus
 Martín – 459,000 (1.16%)
 Gómez – 440,000 (1.11%) Son of Gomes, Gomo, or Gomaro; Germanic
 Ruiz – 321,000 (0.81%) Son of Ruy, variation or short for Rodrigo
 Hernández – 305,000 (0.77%) Son of Hernando, variation of Fernando
 Jiménez – 293,000 (0.74%) son of Jimeno, Xemeno, origin god or Ximeno
 Díaz – 293,000 (0.74%) Son of Diego
 Álvarez – 273,000 (0.69%) Son of Álvaro, from Alvar; Germanic
 Moreno – 261,000 (0.66%) Brown-haired, tanned, brunet
 Muñoz – 241,000 (0.61%) Son of Munio; Pre-Roman
 Alonso – 206,000 (0.52%) Variation of Alfonso; Germanic
 Gutiérrez – 170,000 (0.43%) Son of Gutier, Gutierre, or Gualtierre; Germanic
 Romero – 170,000 (0.43%) (pilgrim) (can also be Italian in origin) 
 Navarro – 158,400 (0.40%) Navarrese, "from Navarre"; toponym
 Torres – 134,600 (0.34%) Towers; toponym
 Domínguez – 134,600 (0.34%) Son of Domingo, from Latin Domenicus, Dominus, "master"
 Gil – 134,600 (0.34%) From older form Egidio; patronymic
 Vázquez – 130,000 (0.33%) Son of Vasco or Velasco
 Serrano – 122,700 (0.31%) "Highlander"
 Ramos – 118,000 (0.30%) Branches; meaning born during Christian festivity Palm Sunday
 Blanco – 118,000 (0.30%) "White"
 Sanz – 106,900 (0.27%)
 Castro – 102,900 (0.26%) "village". See castro and castrum
 Suárez – 102,900 (0.26%) Son of Suero or Suaro; unknown origin
 Ortega – 99,000 (0.25%) From Ortiga, nettle plant
 Rubio – 99,000 (0.25%) Blond, fair-haired; Latin Rubeus, meaning ruddy, reddish
 Molina – 99,000 (0.25%) (Mill, place with mills)
 Delgado – 95,000 (0.24%) "Thin man"
 Ramírez – 95,000 (0.24%) Son of Ramiro, Radamir, or Radmir; Germanic
 Morales – 95,000 (0.24%) Blackberry groves
 Ortiz – 87,120 (0.22%) Son of Ortún; Latin Fortunius, meaning fortunate one
 Marín - 83,160 (0.21%) Latin Marinus, meaning marine
 Iglesias – 83,160 (0.21%) "Churches"

Source: – Data from December 1999. (2004 data confirmation of top 25)

Mexico
List of the most common surnames in Mexico:

 Hernández – 5,526,929
 García – 4,129,360
 Martínez – 3,886,887
 González – 3,188,693
 López – 3,148,024
 Rodríguez – 2,744,179
 Pérez – 2,746,468
 Sánchez – 2,234,625
 Ramírez – 2,070,723
 Flores – 1,392,707 – From Asturias meaning "Flowers"
 Gómez – 989,295
 Torres – 841,966
 Díaz – 811,553
 Vásquez – 806,894
 Cruz – 800,874 – From Castile meaning "Cross"
 Morales – 771,796
 Gutiérrez – 748,789
 Reyes – 738,320 – Meaning either "Kings" or "Royalty"
 Ruíz – 708,718
 Cortez- 108,098
 Jiménez – 670,453 – From Basque 
 Mendoza – 613,683 – From Basque meaning "Mountain"
 Aguilar – 611,904 – Meaning eagles nest, from Latin aquilare 'haunt of eagles' 
 Ortíz – 576,989 – From Basque, Son of Orti
 Álvarez – 557,332
 Castillo – 553,799 – Meaning "Castle"
 Romero – 540,922 – Can be either Spanish or Italian, and have multiple meanings.
 Moreno – 539,927
 Chávez – 517,392 – From Portuguese and Galician, from various places by the name, places derive name from Latin clavis “keys” or aquis Flaviis “at the waters of Flavius”
 Rivera – 508,022 – Meaning either "Riverbank" or "Roadside"
 Ramos – 455,728
 Herrera – 451,226 – From the Latin word ferrāria, meaning either "Iron Mine" or "Iron Works".
 Medina – 431,518 – From the Arabic word madina, meaning city.
 Vargas – 427,854 – From Spanish and Portuguese, from various places called Vargas, meaning variously "thatched hut", "steep slope", or "fenced pastureland which becomes waterlogged in winter".
 Castro – 419,216 – Meaning "village" especially the “hill forts” of the Galician area
 Méndez – 410,239 – Son of Mendo
 Guzmán – 392,284 – From Burgos
 Fernández – 385,741 – Son of Fernando
 Juárez – 384,929 – Regional variant of Suárez, meaning swineherd, from Latin suerius
 Muñoz – 376,633 – Son of Muño
 Ortega – 372,471
 Salazar – 368,231 – From Burgos, meaning "Old hall"
 Rojas – 365,457 – From various places in Burgos or Lugo called Rojas, meaning "red"
 Guerrero – 361,557 – Meaning "Warrior"
 Contreras – 358,521 – "from the surrounding area", toponymic
 Luna – 357,578 – Can be both Spanish, Italian, and Romanian, meaning "Moon".
 Domínguez – 348,182 - Son of Domingo ,  from Latin Domenicus, Dominus, "master"
 Garza – 335,829 – From Basque and Galician, Spanish meaning "heron", used as a descriptor or as part of a place name.
 Velásquez – 331,510 – Son of Velasco
 Estrada – 324,103 – From various places called Estrada, meaning "road", from Latin stata "via" denoting a paved way.
 Soto – 306,227 – From various places called Soto, meaning "grove" or "small wood", from Latin saltus
 Cortez – 301,954 – Meaning  "courteous" or "polite"

Island Regions

Cuba

List of the most common surnames in Cuba:

 Rodríguez – 301, 136
 Pérez – 300,189
 González – 262,311
 Hernández – 215,593
 García – 208,965
 Martinez – 148,674
 Diaz – 136,364
 Fernández – 134,470
 López – 127,525
 Álvarez – 101,010

Dominican Republic

List of the most common surnames in the Dominican Republic:

 Rodríguez – 225,321
 Pérez – 158,059
 Martínez – 141,259
 García – 137,124
 Reyes – 104,892
 Sánchez – 104,392
 Díaz – 95,106
 Peña – 94,396
 Jiménez – 92,978
 Ramírez – 92,863
 Hernández – 91,080
 Rosario – 89,630
 González – 85,757
 Santana – 81,973
 Núñez – 79,374
 Castillo – 78,338
 De la Cruz – 76,977 – Meaning "Of the Cross"
 Cruz – 64,613
 Guzmán – 63,073
 Gómez – 62,310
 Santos – 60,613 – A name of Christian origins, meaning "Saints".
 López – 59,566
 Fuentes – 58,518 – Meaning "Fountains".
 Vásquez – 56,149

Puerto Rico

List of the most common surnames in Puerto Rico:

 Sanchez - 128,384
 Rivera - 114,777	
 Diaz - 107,640
 Rodriguez- 102,137
 Narvaez - 70,764
 Burgos - 68,522
 Colón - 64,692
 Vázquez - 62,659
 Ramos - 60,232
 Ortiz - 60,231
 Morales - 56,574
 Betancourt - 53,974
 Cruz - 52,117
 Santiago - 51,371
 Reyes - 48,780
 Perez - 48,461

Central America

Guatemala

List of the most common surnames in Guatemala:

 Lopez - 371,525
 Garcia - 285,670
 Morales - 228,167
 Hernández - 222,755
 Pérez - 209,963
 González - 208,795
 Rodríguez - 135,978
 De León - 134,010
 Martínez - 123,186
 Castillo - 116,298	
 Estrada - 115,252
 Marroquín - 113,961
 Gómez - 110,824
 Vásquez - 102,153
 Méndez - 98,462
 Reyes - 95,449

See also
Spanish naming customs
Naming customs of Hispanic America

References

Surnames of Spanish origin